Eli Cohen (born 3 October 1972) is an Israeli accountant and politician serving as Israeli Foreign Minister since 29 December 2022. Cohen previously served as Minister of Intelligence and  Minister of the Economy and Industry, and is a member of the Security Cabinet of Israel.

Biography
Cohen was born and raised in the Tel Giborim neighbourhood in Holon. After his IDF national service as a Major in the Israeli air force, he studied at Tel Aviv University, gaining a BA in Accounting and an MBA, majoring in Financing and Accounting. He also obtained a bachelor's degree in Management and economics from the Open University of Israel. He went on to work as an accountant, and lectures at Tel Aviv University.

In 2000 he began to work at the BDO Ziv Haft Accountants’ firm as Head of the Economic Division. In 2003 he joined the credit rating company Maalot S&P and headed the Corporations Division. In 2007 he was appointed Senior Vice President of the Israel Land Development Company.

Prior to the 2015 elections he joined the new Kulanu party, and was placed eighth on its list. He was elected to the Knesset as the party won ten seats. After being elected, he was appointed Chairman of the Reforms Committee, as well as joining the Finance Committee and the Joint Committee for the Defense Budget. On 23 January 2017 he took over from Kulanu leader Moshe Kahlon as Minister of the Economy.

Cohen was placed second on the Kulanu list for the April 2019 elections, and was re-elected despite the party being reduced to four seats. He was re-elected on the Likud list in September 2019 and March 2020. In May 2020 he was appointed Minister of Intelligence in the new government, serving until the formation of another government in June 2021. On 29 December 2022, Cohen was sworn in as Foreign Minister alongside a new government, and will rotate the position with Israel Katz.

Cohen is married, has four children and lives in Holon.

References

External links

1972 births
Living people
Israeli Jews
People from Holon
Tel Aviv University alumni
Open University of Israel alumni
Israeli accountants
Academic staff of Tel Aviv University
Kulanu politicians
Members of the 20th Knesset (2015–2019)
Members of the 21st Knesset (2019)
Members of the 22nd Knesset (2019–2020)
Government ministers of Israel
Members of the 23rd Knesset (2020–2021)
Members of the 25th Knesset (2022–)
Ministers of Intelligence of Israel
Ministers of Foreign Affairs of Israel